Kazimierz Ajdukiewicz (12 December 1890 – 12 April 1963) was a Polish philosopher and logician, a prominent figure in the Lwów–Warsaw school of logic. He originated many novel ideas in semantics. Among these was categorial grammar, a highly flexible framework for the analysis of natural language syntax and (indirectly) semantics that remains a major influence on work in formal linguistics. Ajdukiewicz's fields of research were model theory and the philosophy of science.

Biography
Ajdukiewicz was born in 1890 in Tarnopol in Galicia, which at that time, due to Partitions of Poland, was annexed by Austria-Hungary (The Austrian Partition). His father was a senior civil servant. Ajdukiewicz studied at the University of Lwów, and lectured there, as well as in Warsaw and in Poznań. He received his PhD degree with the thesis on Kant's philosophy of space. He was Rector of the University of Poznań from 1948 to 1952. He was one of the founders of the journal Studia Logica in its current incarnation, editing it from 1953 to his death.

Work
In his early epistemological system, which he called Radical Conventionalism, Ajdukiewicz analyzed any language as a set of expressions or sentences, with inferential rules of meaning that specify the relation of one expression to another, or to external data. There are three kinds of rules: Axiomatic, Deductive, and Empirical. Following the rules, one can map all knowable sentences of a language. However, some languages' vocabularies can produce disconnected sentences, which are only partly mapped by the meaning rules. Therefore, when one uses a language, even scientific one, a conceptual apparatus, an untranslatable set of meanings, is needed too, and with it a choice of the problems to be settled. For this reason the theory is a form of conventionalism, and it is radical because even simple experiential reports are exposed to these language-wide considerations. Ajdukiewicz discarded this theory as the 1930s progressed.

Bibliography
1921 "Z metodologii nauk dedukcyjnych"
1923 "Główne kierunki filozofii"
1928 "Główne zasady metodologii nauk i logiki formalnej"
1931 "O znaczeniu wyrażeń"
1934 "Logiczne podstawy nauczania"
1938 "Propedeutyka filozofii"
1948 "Epistemologia i semantyka"
1949 "Zagadnienia i kierunki filozofii"
1952 "Zarys logiki"
1964 "Zagadnienia empiryzmu a koncepcja znaczenia"
1965 "Logika pragmatyczna"
1960–1965 "Język i poznanie. Wybór pism"
1966- Selected articles in "Logiczna Teoria Nauki" ( Logical Theory of Science) Ed. T.Pawłowski, Printed PWN, Warszawa.
Kazimierz Ajdukiewicz: Pragmatic Logic, Dordrecht, Reidel, 1974
Kazimierz Ajdukiewicz: Problems and Theories of Philosophy, Cambridge, Cambridge University Press, 1975
Kazimierz Ajdukiewicz: The Scientific World-Perspective and Other essays 1931–1963, Dordrecht, Reidel, 1977

See also
 History of philosophy in Poland
 Logology (science of science)

External links

Polish Philosophy Page: Kazimierz Ajdukiewicz
Lwów–Warsaw school of logic, at the Stanford Encyclopedia of Philosophy. Sections on Categorial Grammar and Radical Conventionalism.

1890 births
1963 deaths
Writers from Ternopil
20th-century Polish philosophers
Philosophers of science
Polish logicians
Members of the Polish Academy of Sciences
University of Lviv alumni
Academic staff of the University of Lviv
Academic staff of the University of Warsaw